Camillo Schumann (10 March 1872 – 29 December 1946) was a German late Romantic composer and organist.

Life 
Schumann was born in Königstein as one of twelve children of the city music director Clemens Schumann sen. (1839-1918) and his wife Camilla Ottilie, née Müller.  His elder brother was the composer Georg Schumann; other siblings were Alfred Schumann (1868-1891), latterly concertmaster with the Bremer Philharmoniker, and Clemens Schumann jun. (1876-1938), violinist in the Dresden Staatskapelle from 1900 to 1936.

Schumann received his first lessons, as did his brothers, from his father and learned to play several instruments during his early childhood. From 1889 to 1893, he was trained first for a short time at the Hochschule für Musik Carl Maria von Weber Dresden, then at the Hochschule für Musik und Theater Leipzig with Carl Reinecke, Salomon Jadassohn, Bruno Zwintscher, Paul Homeyer and others. In 1894 and 1895, he studied with Woldemar Bargiel and Robert Radecke at the Royal Music Institute of Berlin.

During his time in Berlin, Schumann worked as a substitute organist in several larger churches. On 1 October 1896 he took up the post of full-time organist at the Hauptkirche St. Georg in Eisenach and at the Wartburg Chapel there. In 1906 he was awarded the title of Grand Ducal Saxon Music Director and Court Organist.

Schumann organised numerous organ and chamber concerts in Eisenach - sometimes with the participation of his brothers Georg and Clemens Jr. - and was particularly committed to cultivating the music of Johann Sebastian Bach in his native city.

In April 1914, he moved to Bad Gottleuba, took on a few more church music engagements near his home, but increasingly devoted himself to his compositional work away from courtly duties. Schumann died here on 29 December 1946 at the age of 74. His grave still exists today. In 1972, a headstone was erected in his memory in his native town of Königstein.

Works

Cello sonatas 
 Cello Sonata No. 1 op. 59 (first edition published by Breitkopf & Härtel, Wiesbaden 2017)
 Cello Sonata No. 2 op. 99 (first edition published by Breitkopf & Härtel, Wiesbaden 2017)
 Cello Sonata No. 3 op. 118a

Choral works 
 Mägdlein saß im Wald und Moos op. 25
 Six cheerful songs op. 33
 Five songs op. 37a
 Psalm of Praise op. 70
 Six Songs op. 73
 Two choruses op. 87

Duets 
 Moment musical op. 15
 Two Recital Pieces for Violin and Piano op. 17
 Larghetto op. 19
 Barcarole op. 21
 Fantasy piece for oboe and piano op. 31
 Two pieces for violin and piano op. 35
 Three Fantasy Pieces for Clarinet and Piano op. 74
 Three Recital Pieces for French Horn and Piano op. 82
 Andante and Humoresque op. 95
 Four Pieces for Violin and Organ op. 109
 Three Pieces for Violin and Piano op. 122
 Three Pieces for Oboe and Piano op. 126a
 Six Pieces for Violin and Piano op. 139
 Two Pieces for Violin and Piano op. 146
 Three Recital Pieces for Violin and Piano o.op.
 Two Pieces for Violin and Piano o.op.
 Eight small recital pieces for violin and piano o.op.
 Two Pieces for Violoncello and Piano o.op.
 Two Pieces for Clarinet and Piano o.op.
 Two Pieces for Violin and Piano o.op.
 Six easy recital pieces for flute and piano o.op.
 Ten Recital Pieces for 2 Soprano or Tenor Recorders o.op.
 Four Recital Pieces for alto flute and piano o.op.
 Three Recital Pieces for 2 Soprano or Tenor Recorders o.op.
 Andantino o.op.
 Pastorale o.op.

Flute Sonata 
 Flute Sonata op. 123a

Fugue 
 Six fugues for organ o.op.

Horn sonatas 
 Horn Sonata No. 1 op. 118b (first edition published by Pfefferkorn Musikverlag, Leipzig 2015).
 Horn Sonata No. 2 o.op. (first edition published by Pfefferkorn Musikverlag, Leipzig 2015)

Intermezzi 
 Five Intermezzi op. 91

Other chamber music 
 Two pieces for cor anglais op. 80
 2 Solo Pieces for Violin op. 96
 Recitative and Romance op. 126b
 Three pieces for solo violin op. 132
 Pastorale o.op.
 Recitative and Adagio op. 9
 Andante cantabile op. 3
 Andante cantabile sostenuto o.op.
 Andante sostenuto o.op.

Clarinet sonatas 
 Clarinet Sonata No. 1 in B flat major op. 112 (first edition published by Pfefferkorn Musikverlag, Leipzig 2015).
 Clarinet Sonata No. 2 in E flat major op. 134 (first edition published by Pfefferkorn Musikverlag, Leipzig 2015)
 Clarinet Sonata No. 3 A flat major o.op. (fragment)
 Clarinet Sonata No. 4 A major o. op.

Piano works 
 Six characteristic fantasy pieces op. 12a
 Five little instructive piano pieces for the youth op. 14
 Three piano pieces op. 15a
 Eight lyrical tone pieces in waltz form op. 18
 Sketches from the Thuringian Forest op. 23
 Six little recital pieces for the youth op. 28
 Ten Piano Pieces op. 39
 Four Piano Pieces op. 45a
 Eight Fantasy Pieces op. 45b
 The Seasons op. 56
 Six Piano Pieces op. 63
 Five Piano Pieces op. 66
 House Music op. 71
 Two Little Instructive Christmas Fantasies op. 86
 Eight Fantasy Pieces op. 97
 Four Piano Pieces op. 102
 Piano Pieces op. 116
 Four Piano Pieces op. 120
 Five Piano Pieces op. 127
 Six Piano Pieces op. 129
 Eight Piano Pieces op. 136
 Five Piano Pieces op. 141
 Six Piano Pieces to Thekla op. 145
 Four Piano Pieces op. 149
 Albumblatt o.op.
 Song without Words o.op.
 Miscellen o.op.
 Three Character Pieces o.op.
 Hausmusik o.op.
 Six Character Pieces o.op.
 Twelve Recital Pieces o.op.
 Six Piano Pieces o.op.
 Six Easy Pieces o.op.
 Twelve Character Pieces o.op.
 Four Piano Pieces o.op.
 Eight Piano Pieces (Booklet 1) o.op.
 Eight Piano Pieces (Booklet 2) o.op.
 Dance Tunes o.op.
 Eight Fantasy Pieces o.op.
 Piano Pieces o.op.

Piano Sonata 
 Sonatina for piano o.op.

Piano trios 
 Piano Trio No. 1 op. 34
 Piano Trio No. 2 op. 88
 Piano Trio No. 3 op. 93

Concert pieces 
 Four Concert Pieces op. 6
 Three Concert Pieces op. 7
 Two Concert Pieces op. 14a
 Two Concert Pieces op. 20
 Three Concert Pieces op. 26a
 Two Concert Pieces op. 85
 Three Concert Pieces op. 89
 Two Concert Pieces op. 158

Songs 
 Three Songs op. 1
 Three sacred songs op. 11
 Two Songs op. 13
 Evening Celebration o.op.
 15 selected songs o.op.

Marches 
 March for 2 recorders and violin o.op.
 Little March o.op.
 Solemn March o.op.

Mazurka 
 Mazurka op. 42

Minuet 
 Minuet from Suite No. 2 op. 30

Notturni 
 Notturno op. 24
 Notturno op. 45

Oboe Sonata 
 Oboe Sonata op. 105

Other orchestral works 
 Larghetto op. 19a
 Andante and Capriccio op. 36
 Three Pieces for String Orchestra op. 44
 Fantasiestück for violin and small orchestra o.op.
 Recitative for Violoncello and Orchestra o.op.
 Fantasy Piece for Clarinet and Orchestra o.op.
 Symphonic Andante cantabile o.op.
 Capriccio for flute and string orchestra o.op.

Organ works 
 Organ Sonata No. 1 op. 12 in D minor
 Organ Sonata No. 2 op. 16 B flat major
 Organ Sonata No. 3 op. 29 in C minor
 Organ Sonata No. 4 op. 67 F major
 Organ Sonata No. 5 op. 40 in G minor (in the manuscript: op. 87)
 Organ Sonata No. 6 op. 110 in A minor
 Two chorale fantasies op. 8
 Fantasy and Fugue on "Eine feste Burg" op. 10
 Postlude to the song "O dass ich tausend Zungen hätte" op. 22
 Four light sustained recital pieces op. 83
 Concert Prelude and Fugue on the Choral "Nun danket alle Gott" op. 100
 Two Preludes and Fugues op. 123
 Adagio for Violoncello and Organ o.op.
 Choral Preludes op. 126
 Choral Preludes op. 131
 Choral Preludes op. 135
 Ten Choral Preludes op. 142
 Choral Preludes op. 148
 Twelve chorale preludes o.op.
 Fourteen chorale preludes o.op.
 Fourteen easy chorale preludes o.op.
 Choral Preludes o.op.
 Ten chorale preludes o.op.
 Elegy for violin and organ o.op.

Harmonium works 
 Suite in F major for harmonium, 1905 op. 26
 Minuet from Suite No. 2 for Harmonium, 1908 op. 30
 Suite No. 2 in D major for harmonium, 1908 op. 37
 Suite No. 3 in F minor for Harmonium, 1911 op. 43
 4 light sustained recital pieces for organ (also harmonium) op. 83
 Sonata for Harmonium op. 103
 Choral Preludes for Harmonium, 1917 op. 148
 Suite for Harmonium, 1942 o. op.

Polonaises 
 Polonaise in B minor op. 4
 Polonaise op. 64

Prelude 
 Festive Prelude in March Form op. 2

Quartets 
 Four small recital pieces o.op.
 Two pieces for 2 tenor flutes and 2 violins o.op.
 Two songs o.op.

Romances 
 Romance for viola and piano op. 14b
 Romance for clarinet and piano op. 43a
 Romance for Violin and Piano op. 118
 Romance for Violin and Orchestra o.op.
 Romance o.op.
 Romance for Violoncello and Piano o.op.
 Romance for Clarinet and Piano o.op.
 Romance for bassoon and piano o.op.

Scherzo 
 Scherzo for piano o.op.

Serenades 
 Serenade for clarinet and piano o.op.
 Serenade for flute and string orchestra o.op.

Sonata 
 Sonata for Harmonium op. 103

String quartets 
 String Quartet in C minor op. 41
 Two Pieces for String Quartet o.op.
 String Quartet in D major o.op.

Suites 
 Suite concertante op. 13a
 Suite No. 1 for Harmonium op. 26
 Suite No. 2 for Harmonium op. 37
 Suite No. 3 for Harmonium op. 43
 Suite for piano 4 hands op. 50
 Suite for Clarinet and Piano op. 102a
 Suite No. 4 for Harmonium op. 119
 Suite for English Horn and Piano op. 129a
 Suite for piano op. 144
 Suite No. 5 for Harmonium op. 157
 Suite in G minor o.op.
 Suite for Harmonium o.op.

Dance 
 Six German Waltzes op. 62

Trios 
 Three Recital Pieces o.op.
 Eight little pieces for 2 recorders and violin o.op.

Variations 
 Choral variations and fugue to the chorale "Befiehl du deine Wege" op. 106
 Theme and twelve variations for piano o.op.

Violin Concerto 
 Violin Concerto in D minor op. 27

Violin sonatas 
 Violin Sonata No. 2 op. 40a
 Violin Sonata No. 3 op. 78
 Violin Sonata No. 4 op. 124
 Violin Sonata No. 5 op. 151
 Violin Sonata No. 1 o.op.

References

External links 
 
 
 
 

1872 births
1946 deaths
19th-century classical composers
19th-century German composers
20th-century classical composers
20th-century German composers
German classical composers
German classical organists
People from Königstein, Saxony